Perumal Venkatesan aka PeeVee (1979, Villupuram, Tamil Nadu, India) is a people photographer and creative entrepreneur based in Bangalore, India. He co-founded the Thalam website. a creative space, both in Bangalore. His photography works have been published in various Indian and international media. His work has also been exhibited at art galleries across India.

Photography career
Perumal Venkatesan hails from an agricultural family. He finished his Chemical Engineering from the University of Madras. After taking up odd jobs for the first two to three years of his career, he zeroed in on his creative instincts. He finished his master's in Business Administration from Pondicherry Central University before stepping into the advertising industry. PeeVee has worked with several MNC clients, including Intel Semiconductor, providing them with creative & photography services for their internal & external communication needs.

PeeVee is part of the photography group, Bangalore Weekend Shoots which organizes photo walks in the city.

Creative Entrepreneur
After a seven-year stint in advertising, he developed an online photo contest called Frames of the City and published a coffee table book in the same name. In April 2013, after 18 months at Red Frames, he  joined his photography friend Dilip Param as a co-founder for Thalam, a creative community space.

Recognitions
In March 2014, PeeVee was invited to be a part of The Beauty & The Grit Dance Photography Workshop by STEM dance Kampni in association with JAAGA, mentored by the International dance artistes Roy Campbell-Moore and Ann Sholem.

In September 2012, Timeout Bengaluru (a global lifestyle magazine) named PeeVee as "One of the 13 local heroes for culture in Bangalore", for his contribution to photography.

In August 2012, PeeVee was invited to present "Crowd Sourcing in Creative Entrepreneurship" at The Asia Entrepreneurship Summit 2012 at ITC Gardenia, Bangalore.

In September 2011, PeeVee was invited to give experTED at School of Management, Pondicherry University, Puducherry.

Collaborations for a Cause
PeeVee with a team of photographers worked closely with INTACH to crowdsource and produce a series of postcards named "Portraits of Bangalore" for INTACH in 2009. PeeVee has contributed six of 16 photographs used in the postcard series.

PeeVee has worked extensively with the Indira Gandhi International Academy, a school for children of SriLankan Tamil Diaspora in India to raise funds by producing various collaterals for year 2011 and 2012.

PeeVee and Selvaprakash L (Chief Photographer, Timeout Bengaluru) under the banner of Korkai, a photojournalist initiative, in association with The Alternative Magazine co-produced and co-directed a short film named "Bangalore Lake Diaries" aimed at creating awareness about the importance of conserving lakes of Bangalore, in March 2013. They have also organised a workshop in April 2013, to educate and empower photojournalists hailing from Rural India.

Personal life
PeeVee is married and lives with his wife, daughter, and in-laws in Indira Nagar, Bangalore. His parents continue to pursue agriculture in their native village.

References

External links

Thalam:

For Bangalore Lake Diaries / Korkai

For Infinity F / BWS / Red Frames:

Businesspeople from Bangalore
People from Viluppuram district
1979 births
University of Madras alumni
Living people
Indian portrait photographers